Marie of Brittany (1268–1339) was the daughter of John II, Duke of Brittany, and Beatrice of England. She is also known as Marie de Dreux.

Family 
Her maternal grandparents were Henry III of England and Eleanor of Provence, Henry was a son of King John of England. John was son of Henry II of England and his wife Eleanor of Aquitaine.

Her sister was Blanche of Brittany, wife to Philip of Artois and mother of Margaret of Artois, Robert III of Artois and Joan of Artois, Countess of Foix. Margaret was mother of Jeanne d'Évreux, Queen of France.

Marriage 
She married Guy IV, Count of Saint-Pol, in 1292, their children were as follows:
 John of Châtillon (d. 1344), Count of Saint Pol
 James of Châtillon (d.s.p. 1365), Lord of Ancre
 Mahaut of Châtillon (1293–1358), married Charles of Valois
 Beatrix of Châtillon, married in 1315 Jean de Dampierre, Lord of Crèvecœur
 Isabeau of Châtillon (d. 19 May 1360), married in May 1311 Guillaume I de Coucy, Lord of Coucy
 Marie of Châtillon, married Aymer de Valence, 2nd Earl of Pembroke
 Eleanor of Châtillon, married Jean III Malet, Lord of Granville
 Joan of Châtillon, married Miles de Noyers, Lord of Maisy

Descendants 
Through her daughter Mahaut, Marie was the maternal grandmother of Marie of Valois, Isabella of Valois, who became Duchess of Bourbon and was the mother of Louis II, Duke of Bourbon, and Joanna of Bourbon, who became Queen of France. Mahaut's other daughter was Blanche of Valois, who married Holy Roman Emperor Charles IV and was the mother of Katharine of Bohemia.

Ancestry

References

1268 births
1339 deaths
House of Dreux
13th-century French people 
13th-century French women 
14th-century French people 
14th-century French women